The UCLA Bruins softball team represents the University of California, Los Angeles in NCAA Division I softball. The Bruins are among the most decorated programs in NCAA softball, leading all schools in NCAA championships with 12, 13 overall Women's College World Series championships, championship game appearances with 22, WCWS appearances with 29, and NCAA Tournament wins with 187. They have dominated against top programs like Arizona (92-59), Washington (62-35), and Alabama (9-1).

History

Sharron Backus era
Judith Holland, UCLA senior associate athletic director, hired Sharon Backus as a part-time coach upon the program's founding in 1975. Holland recalled, "I had seen her play, and she was probably one of the best shortstops who ever played the game." Backus was a physical education teacher at a high school in Anaheim, California when she was hired by UCLA and kept her teaching job for the first couple years after being hired at UCLA. Backus taught in Anaheim in the mornings and drove to UCLA for practice and games in the afternoon. Holland recalled that UCLA paid Backus about $1,500 year as a part-time coach, "and I don't think the money even paid for her gas."

In Backus's first three years at UCLA, the team struggled. Between 1975 and 1977, UCLA compiled a record of 44–20. In the formative years of the program, the Bruins played at city parks, where they were "often bumped from fields by recreational softball leagues." Backus moved her team to the UCLA intramural field, but it was not until 1980 that her team got its own field. Sunset Field and was constructed in 1979 and it was the home of the Bruins through 1993.

In 1978, the Bruins won their first AIAW national softball championship with a 31–3 record. After women's softball became an NCAA sport in 1982, Backus's teams won six of the first nine NCAA softball tournaments.   In all, Backus led UCLA to eight NCAA tournament championships (in addition to the 1978 pre-NCAA championship) in 1982 (33–7–2), 1984 (45–6–1), 1985 (41–9), 1988 (53–8), 1989 (48–4), 1990 (62–7), 1992 (54–2), and 1995 (50–6).

From 1988 to 1990, the Bruins won three consecutive NCAA championships and compiled a record of 163–19.  Backus's success led the Los Angeles Times in 1990 to compare Backus to UCLA's legendary basketball coach John Wooden:"When you talk about UCLA dynasties, you start with John Wooden, who coached the men's basketball team to 10 NCAA titles. But Backus has built a dynasty of her own. ... In total, the Bruins have won seven national titles, finished second twice and third twice in Backus' 15 seasons."
Commenting on the pressure and anxiety fostered by success, Backus noted, "John Wooden once said that he wished one national championship to his best friends, but four to his enemies."

Infractions

In December 1995, the UCLA women's softball program was placed on probation after an investigation revealed that UCLA had awarded more scholarships than were permitted under NCAA rules. 
Amid an NCAA probe prompted by a Los Angeles Times investigation into UCLA pitcher Tanya Harding, Backus announced her retirement in January 1997 after 21 years as the team's head coach.  Backus compiled a record of 847 wins, 167 losses and 3 ties at UCLA.  At the time of her retirement, she was "the winningest college softball coach" in the history of the sport.  Backus told the press when she retired, "I've had a great career at UCLA, but it's time for a change.  My primary reason for stepping down has to do with the illness and death of my mother in early October.  That, plus the ongoing NCAA probe of the softball program have created a level of stress that I feel is best to put behind me at this time."

Sue Enquist era
In 1989, Sue Enquist was appointed co-head coach with Backus, a position they shared through the 1996 season. Enquist played softball at UCLA under Sharron Backus from 1975 to 1978. She helped lead UCLA to its first national softball championship in 1978 and became UCLA's first All-American softball player. Her career batting average of .401 was the UCLA team record for 24 years. Prior to becoming co-head coach, she was an assistant coach under Backus from 1980 to 1988.

Following Backus's retirement, Enquist became the sole head coach at UCLA in 1997, a position she held for ten years from 1997 to 2006. Enquist retired from UCLA in 2006.  In 18 years as the co-head coach and sole head coach at UCLA, Enquist compiled a record of 887–175–1.  Her career winning percentage of .835 is the highest recorded by any of the college softball coaches with 800 career wins. During her years as a player and coach at UCLA, the Bruins softball team won 11 national championships in 1978, 1982, 1984, 1985, 1988, 1989, 1990, 1992, 1999, 2003 and 2004.

Kelly Inouye-Perez era 
The UCLA Bruins are currently under the coaching of Kelly Inouye-Perez, who started in 2007. A former UCLA catcher, she played under Coach Sue Enquist. She was named First-Team All PAC-10 her freshmen year and Second Team All-PAC-10 her sophomore season. She helped lead the Bruins to the 1989 and 1990 National championship before getting shoulder surgery in 1991. She came back the following year and got 2nd team All-PAC-10 honor and won the national championship with a 54-2 record on the season. 

Perez was the assistant coach for the Bruins from 1994 to 2006. As her time as assistant coach, she helped accumulate a 617-150-1 overall record, 3 PAC-10 championships, 7 championship game appearances, 3 national championships, and named the National Coaching Staff of the Year award. She guided recognizable pitchers and catchers in the game like Stacey Nuveman who became a 3 time PAC-10 Player of the Year, 4 time 1st team All-American, and NCAA's all time single season and career home run leader. 

She became only the third coach in UCLA softball history on January 1, 2007. So far in her time as UCLA head coach, she accumulated 32 NFCA All-American awards, 67 All-Region honors, and 89 All Pafific-10/Pac-12 awards from her players. She brought two national championship back to the university in 2010 and 2019. She even accomplished her 600th win of her career when she beat the Oklahoma Sooners in the national championship game in 2019.

Head coaches

Year-by-year results

NCAA Tournament seeding history
National seeding began in 2005. The UCLA Bruins have been a national seed 14 of the 16 tournaments.

Notable players

National awards
NFCA National Freshman of the Year
Rachel Garcia (2017)

NFCA National Player of the Year
Rachel Garcia (2018, 2021)

NFCA National Pitcher of the Year
Rachel Garcia (2019)

Softball America Player of the Year
Rachel Garcia (2019)

Softball America Pitcher of the Year
Megan Faraimo (2020)

Softball America Freshman of the Year
Maya Brady (2020)

USA Softball Collegiate Player of the Year
Rachel Garcia (2018, 2019)

Conference awards
Pac-12 Player of the Year
Lisa Longaker (1987, 1988, 1990)
Lisa Fernandez (1991, 1992, 1993)
Stacey Nuveman (1999, 2001, 2002)
Natasha Watley (2003)
Andrea Duran (2006)
Megan Langenfeld (2010)
Ally Carda (2014, 2015)
Rachel Garcia (2018, 2019, 2021)

Pac-12 Pitcher of the Year
Courtney Dale (1999)
Keira Goerl (2003)
Rachel Garcia (2019)
Megan Faraimo (2022)

Pac-12 Defensive Player of the Year
Briana Perez (2022)

Pac-12 Freshman of the Year
Tanya Harding (1995)
Julie Adams (1996)
Stacey Nuveman (1997)
Anjelica Selden (2005)
Stephany LaRosa (2012)
Rachel Garcia (2017)
Aaliyah Jordan (2018)
Megan Faraimo (2019)

Pac-12 Coach of the Year
Sharron Backus (1990, 1992, 1993, 1995)
Sue Enquist (1995, 1999, 2006)
Kelly Inouye-Perez (2009, 2021)

References